Causantín mac Cináeda (died 877) was a king of the Picts. He is often known as Constantine I in reference to his place in modern lists of kings of Scots, but contemporary sources described  only as a Pictish king. It is likely that Causantín's reign witnessed increased activity by Vikings, based in Ireland, Northumbria and northern Britain. He died fighting one such invasion.

Sources

Very few records of ninth century events in northern Britain survive. The main local source from the period is the Chronicle of the Kings of Alba, a list of kings from Cináed mac Ailpín (died 858) to Cináed mac Maíl Coluim (died 995). The list survives in the Poppleton Manuscript, a thirteenth-century compilation. Originally simply a list of kings with reign lengths, the other details contained in the Poppleton Manuscript version were added from the tenth century onwards. In addition to this, later king lists survive. The earliest genealogical records of the descendants of Cináed mac Ailpín may date from the end of the tenth century, but their value lies more in their context, and the information they provide about the interests of those for whom they were compiled, than in the unreliable claims they contain. The Pictish king-lists originally ended with this Causantín, who was reckoned the seventieth and last king of the Picts.

For narrative history the principal sources are the Anglo-Saxon Chronicle and the Irish annals. While Scandinavian sagas describe events in 9th century Britain, their value as sources of historical narrative, rather than documents of social history, is disputed. If the sources for north-eastern Britain, the lands of the kingdom of Northumbria and the former Pictland, are limited and late, those for the areas on the Irish Sea and Atlantic coasts—the modern regions of north-west England and all of northern and western Scotland—are non-existent, and archaeology and toponymy are of primary importance.

Languages and names

Writing a century before Causantín was born, Bede recorded five languages in Britain. Latin, the common language of the church; Old English, the language of the Angles and Saxons; Irish, spoken on the western coasts of Britain and in Ireland; Brythonic, ancestor of the Welsh language, spoken in large parts of western Britain; and Pictish, spoken in northern Britain. By the ninth century a sixth language, Old Norse, had arrived with the Vikings.

Amlaíb and Ímar
Viking activity in northern Britain appears to have reached a peak during Causantín's reign. Viking armies were led by a small group of men who may have been kinsmen. Among those noted by the Irish annals, the Chronicle of the Kings of Alba and the Anglo-Saxon Chronicle are Ívarr—Ímar in Irish sources—who was active from East Anglia to Ireland, Halfdán—Albdann in Irish, Healfdene in Old English— and Amlaíb or Óláfr. As well as these leaders, various others related to them appear in the surviving record.

Viking activity in Britain increased in 865 when the Great Heathen Army, probably a part of the forces which had been active in Francia, landed in East Anglia. The following year, having obtained tribute from the East Anglian King Edmund, the Great Army moved north, seizing York, chief city of the Northumbrians. The Great Army defeated an attack on York by the two rivals for the Northumbrian throne, Osberht and Ælla, who had put aside their differences in the face of a common enemy. Both would-be kings were killed in the failed assault, probably on 21 March 867. Following this, the leaders of the Great Army are said to have installed one Ecgberht as king of the Northumbrians. Their next target was Mercia where King Burgred, aided by his brother-in-law King Æthelred of Wessex, drove them off.

While the kingdoms of East Anglia, Mercia and Northumbria were under attack, other Viking armies were active in the far north. Amlaíb and Auisle (Ásl or Auðgísl), said to be his brother, brought an army to Fortriu and obtained tribute and hostages in 866. Historians disagree as to whether the army returned to Ireland in 866, 867 or even in 869. Late sources of uncertain reliability state that Auisle was killed by Amlaíb in 867 in a dispute over Amlaíb's wife, the daughter of Cináed. It is unclear whether, if accurate, this woman should be identified as a daughter of Cináed mac Ailpín, and thus Causantín's sister, or as a daughter of Cináed mac Conaing, king of Brega. While Amlaíb and Auisle were in north Britain, the Annals of Ulster record that Áed Findliath, High King of Ireland, took advantage of their absence to destroy the longphorts along the northern coasts of Ireland. Áed Findliath was married to Causantín's sister Máel Muire. She later married Áed's successor Flann Sinna. Her death is recorded in 913.

In 870, Amlaíb and Ívarr attacked Dumbarton Rock, where the River Leven meets the River Clyde, the chief place of the kingdom of Alt Clut, south-western neighbour of Pictland. The siege lasted four months before the fortress fell to the Vikings who returned to Ireland with many prisoners, "Angles, Britons and Picts", in 871. Archaeological evidence suggests that Dumbarton Rock was largely abandoned and that Govan replaced it as the chief place of the kingdom of Strathclyde, as Alt Clut was later known. King Artgal of Alt Clut did not long survive these events, being killed "at the instigation" of Causantín son of Cináed two years later. Artgal's son and successor Run was married to a sister of Causantín.

Amlaíb disappears from Irish annals after his return to Ireland in 871. According to the Chronicle of the Kings of Alba he was killed by Causantín either in 871 or 872 when he returned to Pictland to collect further tribute. His ally Ívarr died in 873.

Last days of the Pictish kingdom

In 875, the Chronicle and the Annals of Ulster again report a Viking army in Pictland; the Annals of Ulster say that "a great slaughter of the Picts resulted". No name is given to the battle in which the slaughter occurred, yet the Chronicle notes a battle fought between Danes and Scots near Dollar but notes a subsequent "annihilation" at Atholl. In 877, shortly after building a new church for the Culdees at St Andrews, Causantín was captured and executed (or perhaps killed in battle) after defending against Viking raiders. Although there is agreement on the time and general manner of his death, it is not clear where this happened. Some believe he was beheaded on a Fife beach, following a battle at Fife Ness, near Crail. William Forbes Skene reads the Chronicle as placing Causantín's death at Inverdovat (by Newport-on-Tay), which appears to match the Prophecy of Berchán. The account in the Chronicle of Melrose names the place as the "Black Cave," and John of Fordun calls it the "Black Den". Causantín was buried on Iona.

Aftermath
Causantín's son Domnall and his descendants represented the main line of the kings of Alba and later Scotland.

Notes

References

Bibliography

External links
 Constantine I at the official website of the British monarchy

Pictish monarchs
Scottish pre-union military personnel killed in action
House of Alpin
9th-century Scottish monarchs
Monarchs killed in action
Year of birth unknown
877 deaths
Burials in Iona